Asura haemachroa is a moth of the  family Erebidae. It is found on the Solomon Islands.

References

haemachroa
Moths described in 1905
Moths of Oceania